Gajanand Singh (born 3 October 1987) is a Guyanese-American cricketer who plays for the United States national cricket team. He previously represented the West Indies under-19 cricket team at the 2006 U-19 Cricket World Cup in Sri Lanka and played first-class and List A cricket for Guyana.

Singh made his Twenty20 debut for Guyana Amazon Warriors in the 2017 Caribbean Premier League on 6 August 2017.

In January 2021, USA Cricket named Singh in a 44-man squad to begin training in Texas ahead of the 2021 Oman Tri-Nation Series. In June 2021, he was selected to take part in the Minor League Cricket tournament in the United States following the players' draft. In August 2021, Singh was named in the United States' One Day International (ODI) squad for the rescheduled tri-series in Oman and their matches against Papua New Guinea. He made his ODI debut on 6 September 2021, for the United States against Papua New Guinea.

In October 2021, he was named in the American Twenty20 International (T20I) squad for the 2021 ICC Men's T20 World Cup Americas Qualifier tournament in Antigua. He made his T20I debut on 7 November 2021, for the United States against Belize.

References

1987 births
Living people
Indo-Guyanese people
Guyanese cricketers
People from East Berbice-Corentyne
Guyana cricketers
Guyana Amazon Warriors cricketers
American cricketers
United States One Day International cricketers
United States Twenty20 International cricketers
Guyanese emigrants to the United States
American people of Indo-Guyanese descent
American sportspeople of Guyanese descent
American sportspeople of Indian descent